Indra Gunawan (September 23, 1947 in Surakarta – June 7, 2009 in Jakarta) was an Indonesian badminton player and coach.

Profile
He was a former player from Indonesia and was specialized in men's doubles. As a coach he was the National coach from both Indonesia and Malaysia. Gunawan finished third in the 1970 Asian Games in doubles with Rudy Hartono and won the Men's team gold for Indonesia at the 1970 Asian Games event in Bangkok, Thailand. In the 1970 Thomas Cup in Kuala Lumpur, he became men's team world champion with the Indonesian squad, as well as 1973 in Jakarta, where he however was not selected in the final. In 1971 he won the Asian Cup in Men's doubles with Nara Sudjana in Jakarta. In the All England, he reached the final in 1971, and 1973 the semifinals.

Career Coach 

Indra was a former National coach for both Indonesia and Malaysia. He was head coach of the Indonesian team at the Pelatnas of PBSI in the nineties. The Indonesian came to Malaysia as the singles chief coach in 2001 and together with doubles chief coach Park Joo-bong, the duo nearly helped Malaysia to win the Thomas Cup Finals in 2002 in Guangzhou. Malaysia went down 2–3 to Indonesia in the final but Indra will be remembered for his faith and gamble on exposing younger players, especially Lee Tsuen Seng. Indra was also known for his compassion for senior players. He gave former Malaysian internationals Ong Ewe Hock and Yong Hock Kin a second chance to salvage their positions in the National team of Malaysia. Indra was well known for his key part in Malaysian world famous player Lee Chong Wei’s amazing international debut, back when he was head coach for the National team of Malaysia. Chong Wei was only 17-years-old when he joined the National team under Indra. Thanks to a good foundation laid by Indra, Chong Wei began his journey as the king of the local badminton circuit. Indra was also the manager of the six-court Wira Hall in Jakarta.
As one of the most respected figures of the badminton world tour, Indra Gunawan died at the Pantai Indah Kapuk Hospital, in his home of Jakarta on June 7th, 2009, at the age of 61, after a long disease – Indra was diagnosed with colon cancer.

Personal life 

Indra was married and left behind his wife Dewi Mirida and three children.

Achievements

Asian Games 
Men's doubles

Asian Championships 

Men's doubles 

Mixed doubles

International Open Tournaments (1 title, 4 runners-up) 

Men's doubles

References

1947 births
2009 deaths
Indonesian male badminton players
Badminton coaches
Badminton in Indonesia
Asian Games medalists in badminton
Badminton players at the 1970 Asian Games
Asian Games gold medalists for Indonesia
Asian Games bronze medalists for Indonesia
Medalists at the 1970 Asian Games
People from Surakarta
Sportspeople from Central Java
20th-century Indonesian people
21st-century Indonesian people